Saint-Bernard is a commune in the Haut-Rhin department in Alsace in north-eastern France.

The commune was created on 1 August 1972 through the merger of the municipalities of Brinighoffen (German: Brünighofen) and Enschingen.

The Rhône–Rhine Canal runs through the village, to the south of the centre, as do the rivers Largue and Allmendgraben.

See also
 Communes of the Haut-Rhin department

References

Communes of Haut-Rhin